David O'Gara is a Gaelic footballer from County Roscommon. He plays with the Roscommon senior football team and Roscommon Gaels club. In 2010 he was a member of the Roscommon squad that secured the Connacht Senior Football Championship in a 0-14 to 0-13 win over Sligo. He is a son of former Roscommon player of the 1970s and 1980s John O'Gara.

He has played for NUI Galway.

Honours
2006 All-Ireland Minor Football Championship
2006 Connacht Minor Football Championship
2010 Connacht Senior Football Championship

References
 https://web.archive.org/web/20120204082343/http://www.hoganstand.com/Roscommon/Profile.aspx
 http://hoganstand.com/roscommon/ArticleForm.aspx?ID=132944

Year of birth missing (living people)
Living people
University of Galway Gaelic footballers
Roscommon Gaels Gaelic footballers
Roscommon inter-county Gaelic footballers